The Ice Climbing World Youth Championships is an annual international competition of ice climbing. The competition, organized by the International Climbing and Mountaineering Federation, consists of two events: lead and speed climbing.

U16 Men

Lead

Speed

U16 Woman

Lead

Speed

U19 Men

Lead

Speed

U19 Woman

Lead

Speed

U22 Men

Lead

Speed

U22 Woman

Lead

Speed

See also 

 UIAA Ice Climbing World Championships
 UIAA Ice Climbing World Cup

References 

Ice climbing
World championships in winter sports
World youth sports competitions